Paul Khoury is a former Lebanon international rugby league footballer who represented Lebanon at the 2000 World Cup.

Background
Khoury was born in Sydney, New South Wales, Australia.

Playing career
Khoury played for the Sydney City Roosters in the National Rugby League. In 1999 he represented Lebanon, being named man of the match when they defeated the United States to qualify for the 2000 World Cup. He went on to be named in Lebanon's World Cup squad and last played for Lebanon in 2008.

References

1977 births
Australian rugby league players
Australian people of Lebanese descent
Lebanon national rugby league team players
Sydney Roosters players
Rugby league halfbacks
Living people
Rugby league players from Sydney